Siegfried Joseph Charoux (15 November 1896 – 26 April 1967) was an artist, primarily a figurative sculptor working in bronze, stone, or terracotta.  Born in Austria, he moved to England in 1935, where he became naturalised in 1946.

Early and private life
Charoux was born in Vienna. His father Josef Kinich was a civil engineer who had served in the Austro-Hungarian Army.  His mother Anna Buchta (née Charous) was a dressmaker.  She had Czech ancestry, and was the widow of Johann Buchta. He was given the name Siegfried Buchta at birth, and changed his name to Siegfried Charous in 1914 after his mother's maiden name. Later, as a political gesture and a derivative of Chat Roux (Red Cat) he changed the spelling of his surname to Charoux in 1926, at the time of his marriage to Margarethe Treibl (1895 - 1985).  They had no children. Margarethe was in international textile trader who traveled extensively and introduced Charoux's sculptures to many of the countries in which she traded.

Charoux attended schools in Vienna, and was conscripted into the Austro-Hungarian Army in early 1915. His right hand was wounded in the First World War, with nerve damage causing paralysis, and he left the army due to his wounds in 1917.  He regained use of his right arm after a successful surgical operation.

Career in Vienna
He studied privately under .  He was rejected by the Vienna School of Applied Arts (Hochschule für angewandte Kunst), but attended the Vienna Academy (Akademie der Bildenden Künste), under Hans Bitterlich, from 1922 to 1924.

He was a political cartoonist from about 1923 to about 1933, using the pseudonym "Chat Roux". His cartoons were published in the Arbeiter-Zeitung and other left-wing journals. He shifted to sculpture, opening his own studio in 1926, and made memorials in Vienna to Robert Blum (1927) and Matteotti (1929). In 1930 he won an international competition to create a memorial statue to Gotthold Ephraim Lessing, erected in Judenplatz in 1935. (The statue was removed by the Nazi regime after 1939 and destroyed.

Career in England
Life became difficult for Charoux in Austria due to his left-wing political views, and he moved to England in September 1935.  He was interned on the Isle of Man as an enemy alien during the Second World War, but became naturalized as a British subject in November 1946.

He made a memorial bust of Amy Johnson in 1944, displayed at the Ferens Art Gallery in Hull.  He did stone carvings for the School of Anatomy and the Engineering Laboratory at Cambridge University in 1948. His work was also part of the sculpture event in the art competition at the 1948 Summer Olympics.

His terracotta statue Youth: Standing Boy (1948) - built using an Etruscan technique in layers without an armature - was bought by the Tate Gallery in 1948, using funds from the Chantrey Bequest.  Charoux's style altered dramatically when he created The Pedestrian (1951) which acknowledged an early influence of American culture in post-war London. The Tate also holds his statue of Civilisation: The Judge (1962), made for the Royal Courts of Justice in the Strand as part of a series of six sculptures, the others including Cellist for the Royal Festival Hall, Motor Cyclist for the Shell Building on the South Bank, Violinist, and Survivor.  He also contributed to open-air exhibitions of sculptures held at Battersea Park in 1948, 1951, 1954, and 1960, and at Holland Park in 1957.  He also exhibited watercolours at the Piccadilly Gallery in 1958.

His monumental relief work in concrete, The Islanders, depicting three figures, man woman and child, was exhibited at the Festival of Britain in 1951 as part of the Sea and Ships Pavilion designed by Basil Spence, but it was destroyed after the exhibition closed. He created his sculpture The Neighbours for the Quadrant Estate in Highbury (1959) and his sculpture Man for the South Bank in 1960. Perhaps the most significant works that Charoux created were those for his Civilisation Cyclus portraying studies of everyday Londoners.

He was elected as an Associate of the Royal Academy (ARA) in 1949, and became a full member in 1956.

He died at Manor House Hospital in Hendon.

References

 Siegfried Charoux 1896-1967, Tate Gallery
 Hans Kurt Gross, 'Charoux, Siegfried Joseph (1896–1967)', Oxford Dictionary of National Biography, Oxford University Press, 2004 accessed 5 October 2016
 'Siegfried Joseph Charoux RA', Mapping the Practice and Profession of Sculpture in Britain and Ireland 1851-1951, University of Glasgow History of Art and HATII, online database 2011 accessed 5 October 2016
 Melanie Veasey, 'An insistence on freedom: Siegfried Charoux's Civilisation Cyclus, The Sculpture Journal, 2019, 28.1.7, pp. 123–138
Melanie Veasey, Siegfried Charoux's The Pedestrian (1951):  https://chronicle250.com/1951

External links

1896 births
1967 deaths
Austrian sculptors
Royal Academicians
Olympic competitors in art competitions